Ṣafīyyah bint Abī al-ʿĀṣ was the daughter of Abu al-As ibn Umayya.

She was a wife of Abu Sufyan ibn Harb (her cousin). She had at least two daughters with him: Ramlah, who would later adopt Islam and marry Muhammad, and Umayna.

See also
Saffiyah (name)

References

Banu Umayya
7th-century Arabs